Petseri Postimees was a newspaper published in Estonia in 1909–1910. Its editor was Anton Jürgenstein.

References

Newspapers published in Estonia
Seto